Gregory Darryle Howard (born January 8, 1948) is an American former professional basketball player who played in the National Basketball Association (NBA) for two seasons.

Career
Howard attended Fifth Avenue High School in Pittsburgh until 1966. After one year at Hartnell College, he enrolled at the University of New Mexico, playing for the New Mexico Lobos men's basketball team from 1967 to 1969. In 1968-69, he was the Lobos leading scorer (19.7 points per game). In a total of 45 games for New Mexico, he averaged 16.6 points and 10.1 rebounds per contest. Howard had 22 double-doubles for the Lobos.

After playing for one season in the Italian Serie A for Brill Cagliari, he was selected in the first round of 1970 NBA draft by the Phoenix Suns. He played the 1970–71 season with the team before being traded to the Cleveland Cavaliers in 1971. He appeared in a total of 92 NBA games, averaging 3.4 points and 2.5 rebounds a contest. 

In 1974–75, Howard played for ABC Nantes in France. From 1975 to 1977, he played for Fribourg Olympic Basket. His dominating and spectacular style of play was considered new for Swiss basketball. He moved to Portugal in 1977 and was signed by Sporting CP.

References

1948 births
Living people
American expatriate basketball people in Italy
American men's basketball players
Basketball players from Pittsburgh
Cleveland Cavaliers players
Fribourg Olympic players
Hartnell Panthers men's basketball players
Lega Basket Serie A players
New Mexico Lobos men's basketball players
Phoenix Suns draft picks
Phoenix Suns players
Power forwards (basketball)